James Herman Banning (November 5, 1900 – February 5, 1933) was an American aviation pioneer. In 1932, James Banning, accompanied by Thomas C. Allen, became America's first black aviator to fly coast-to-coast.

Background
Dreaming from boyhood of being a pilot, Banning eventually learned to fly from an army aviator after being repeatedly turned away from flight schools due to racial discrimination. He later became a demonstration pilot on the west coast, flying a biplane named "Miss Ames" (he had attended Iowa State University in Ames, Iowa).

The flight
James Banning and his mechanic Thomas Allen made the historic flight using a plane supplemented with surplus parts. The "Flying Hoboes," as they were affectionately known, made the 3,300 mile trip from Los Angeles to Long Island, NY in 41 hours and 27 minutes aloft. However, the trip actually required 21 days to complete because the pilots had to raise money for the next leg of the trip each time they stopped.

Death
Only four months after his historic flight, Banning was killed in a plane crash during an air show at Camp Kearny military base in San Diego on February 5, 1933. He was a passenger in a two-seater Travel Air biplane flown by Navy machinist mate second class Albert Burghardt, who was at the controls because Banning had been refused use of the airplane by an instructor at the Airtech Flying School. After taking off and climbing four-hundred feet, the plane stalled and entered an unrecoverable tailspin in front of hundreds of horrified spectators. Banning was recovered from the wreckage and died one hour later at a local hospital.

Legacy 
A large photograph of Banning is displayed at the Disney California Adventure section of Disneyland in Anaheim, CA at the ride Soarin' Around the World, a flight motion simulator attraction. Provided underneath his photo is a plaque with a brief summary of his achievements and accomplishments as a tribute to the Wings of Fame, a hallway where guests wait during the line queue to the actual ride where many photographs and models of early plane concepts are displayed, including homages to significant individuals in aviation history, including James Banning on the right side.

See also
Emory Conrad Malick

References

1900 births
1933 deaths
Accidental deaths in California
African-American aviators
American aviators
Aviators killed in aviation accidents or incidents in the United States
Burials at Evergreen Cemetery, Los Angeles
Iowa State University alumni
Victims of aviation accidents or incidents in 1933
20th-century African-American people